Esophageal dilatation is a therapeutic endoscopic procedure that enlarges the lumen of the esophagus.

Indications

It can be used to treat a number of medical conditions that result in narrowing of the esophageal lumen, or decrease motility in the distal esophagus.  These include the following:
 Peptic stricture
 Eosinophilic esophagitis
 Schatzki rings
 Achalasia
 Scleroderma esophagus
 Rarely esophageal cancer

Types of dilators
There are three major classes of dilators:
 Mercury-weighted bougies are blindly inserted bougies placed into the esophagus by the treating physician.  They are passed in sequentially increasing sizes to dilate the obstructed area.  They must be used with precaution in patients with narrow strictures, as they may curl proximal to the obstruction.
 Bougie over guidewire dilators are used at the time of gastroscopy or fluoroscopy.  An endoscopy is usually performed first to evaluate the anatomy, and a guidewire is passed into the stomach past the obstruction.  This may also be done fluoroscopically.  Bougies are again introduced—this time over the guidewire—in sequentially increasing sizes.
 Pneumatic dilatation or balloon dilatation is also typically done at the time of endoscopy or fluoroscopy.  A balloon is inserted in the deflated form into the area of narrowing.  It is then inflated with air to a certain pressure that is pre-set for a given circumference.

Complications
Complications of esophageal dilatation include the following:
 Odynophagia, or painful swallowing
 Hematemesis, or bloody vomit
 Esophageal perforation
 Mediastinitis

References

Digestive system procedures
Endoscopy